"1400 / 999 Freestyle" is a song by American rapper Trippie Redd featuring American rapper Juice Wrld. It was released on November 9, 2018 as a track from the former's third commercial mixtape A Love Letter to You 3 (2018). The song was produced by OZ and Pas Beatz, and samples Canadian R&B singer Plaza's 2016 song "Wanting You".

Composition
The song contains a "serene" piano riff and a "mysterious" woodwind sounding synth. Juice Wrld performs the chorus, which appears only in the beginning and end, and the first verse, Trippie Redd performs the second verse. The song sees the rappers rhyming about having sex, as well as drugs and money. Redd also sings about his "oh-so-broken heart" in his verse.

Critical reception
Charles Holmes of Rolling Stone described the rappers as "gleefully rapping for nearly three minutes about nothing" in the song. He then added, "It's gloriously carefree, opting for nonsense that sounds good over any sort of lasting coherence. Nevertheless, Redd's verse is a speedy and furious tumble of syllables that crescendos when the Ohio MC perfectly ends the last six bars with transcendent 'yeah' adlibs." Trey Alston called Juice Wrld's feature an "eye-rolling tough guy act".

Charts

Certifications

References

2018 songs
Trippie Redd songs
Juice Wrld songs
Songs written by Trippie Redd
Songs written by Juice Wrld
Songs written by Oz (record producer)
Songs about drugs